Brazos High School is a public high school located in the city of Wallis, Texas, in Austin County, United States It is a part of the Brazos Independent School District located in central Austin County and classified as a 2A school by the UIL. Brazos High School was created by the merger of Wallis and Orchard in 1974 and for a short time was known as Wallis-Orchard Brazos High School. In 2013, 2014, and 2015 the school was rated "Met Standard" by the Texas Education Agency.

Athletics
The Brazos Cougars compete in these sports  

Baseball
Basketball
Cross Country
Football
Golf
Powerlifting
Softball
Tennis
Track and Field
Volleyball

State Titles
Boys Cross Country 
2007(2A)
Volleyball 
1977(1A), 1978(1A), 1979(1A), 1998(2A), 2003(2A)

References

External links
 Brazos ISD website

Public high schools in Texas
Schools in Austin County, Texas
1974 establishments in Texas